The United Kingdom, competing under the team name "Great Britain and Northern Ireland",  was one of the host nations of the inaugural 2018 European Championships in Berlin, Germany and Glasgow, United Kingdom. Great Britain and Northern Ireland competed at the championships which lasted from 2 to 12 August 2018. Great Britain and Northern Ireland competed in 7 sports.

Medallists

|  style="text-align:left; width:78%; vertical-align:top;"|

* Participated in the heats only and received medals.
|  style="text-align:left; width:22%; vertical-align:top;"|

See also
Great Britain and Northern Ireland at the 2018 European Athletics Championships

References

External links
 European Championships official site 

2018
Nations at the 2018 European Championships
2018 in British sport